WKLD may refer to:

 WKLD-LP, a low-power radio station (92.7 FM) licensed to serve Bainbridge, Georgia, United States
 WZZN, a radio station (97.7 FM) licensed to serve Union Grove, Alabama, United States, which held the call sign WKLD until 2009